Phibs is the pseudonym of Tim De Haan (born 1974), a notable graffiti artist operating out of Sydney, Australia.

Biography
Phibs was born in a coastal town in Narooma, New South Wales, Australia before moving to Sydney in the late 1980s and then Melbourne in 2001.  Phibs has been commissioned to large scale artworks by companies such as Rip Curl and Absolut Vodka. He also has been commissioned to decorate a number of buildings across Sydney such as jivamukti yoga in Newtown, and a number of murals throughout the city of Sydney, Melbourne and Perth. He has also travelled to countries outside of Australia where his work can also be seen on walls in Amsterdam, Brooklyn, Miami and New York. Phibs is still a prominent member of the Fitzroy-based Everfresh Studio Collective, alongside street artists Rone and Mike Makka.

Phibs was featured in the 2005 documentary, RASH, where he discusses his roots in graffiti art and paints murals with United States hip hop artist Chali 2na.

Phibs was also one of the Australian street artists featured in Jon Reiss' 2010 documentary webseries, Bomb It 2.

In September 2015 the premiere episode of Event, which aired on Foxtel Arts, featured Phibs as its Australian Artist in Residence.

A number of Phibs’ print works have been acquired by the National Gallery of Australia for its permanent collection.

In recent years Phibs has been project managing and curating street art festivals. Most recently the Walk the Walls Festival in Caringbah (2018)   and Cronulla (2019) with support from Sutherland Shire Council and NSW Government.

Phibs is currently based in both Sydney and Melbourne.

Style and influences

Phibs uses a complex wildstyle graffiti that incorporates interwoven and overlapping lettering and characters. His compositions usually feature animals such as fish and birds in a vibrant mix of complementary colours. He explores an interest in shapes by fragmenting and breaking up these subjects. Phib's artwork is heavily inspired by nature; flora and fauna are common themes. He employs abstraction, and symbolism using bold stylised line work and symmetry which are recognisable traits. Phibs credits influential Sydney writers, Dmote and Prins for being mentors.

See also 
List of Australian street artists
Types of graffiti
List of graffiti artists
RASH Documentary Melbourne, 2005
Spray paint art

External links 
www.phibs.com
 Official site
 

MTV Asia video showing works by Phibs
 WORKHORSE VISUALS displaying Pictures of Phibs
Rousseau, Nina (2012). Paste Modernism, The Sydney Morning Herald article
Phibs interview with Jonathan Green on RN Drive ABC, (2013)
Baz Luhrmann, Absolut Oz collaboration with artist Phibs, (2014) video and article
Sculpture on the Edge, Bermagui, (2014)
Chamberlin, Lou (2015). Street Art: Australia. Explore Australia. 
Peter Parks/AFP via Getty Images, (2016)
Wollongong workshop with Tim Phibs, (2017)
Collaboration with Nike, (2017)
Crush Festival, Bundaberg (2017)
Walk the Walls, Caringbah (2018) article
Walk the Walls, Cronulla (2019) booklet
Walk the Walls, Cronulla (2019) Interview with Tim 'Phibs'

References

1974 births
Living people
Artists from Melbourne
Australian graffiti artists
Street artists
Pseudonymous artists